The Preußischer Präsentiermarsch (Prussian Inspection March), also known as the Präsentiermarsch "Friedrich Wilhelms III.", is a German military march composed by Frederick William III of Prussia sometime around 1820. A traditional inspection march used in every German military since the mid-19th century, this is the traditional inspection and colors presentation march of the German Federal Armed Forces, the Bundeswehr. It is also played during visits by foreign leaders to Germany by the Staff Band of the Bundeswehr during arrival honors ceremonies. It is also a favorite piece of German marching bands, played in civil functions and parades. In Bolivia this has become the standard marchpast piece of the Bolivian Navy, but adapted in slow time.

References

External links
 German military music - Prussian Presentation March
 Adolf Hitler's 50th Birthday Parade, with march playing between 0:59 and 2:20, during the presentation of the colors of the German Armed Forces

German military marches
Culture of Prussia